Dragiša Vučinić (born 4 April 1948) is a Serbian former professional basketball player and coach who spent major part of his career with Crvena zvezda.

Playing career 
Vučinić grew up playing basketball for his hometown team KK Lokomotiva Mostar. In 1967, he left the club joining Belgrade-based team Crvena zvezda.

Crvena zvezda (1967–1979) 
On 2 May 1967, Vučinić made his debut with Crvena zvezda, in a game with Split. He spent, almost, entire playing career with the club, playing in the end of 1960s and during 1970s. He is ranked 2nd all-time Crvena zvezda leader in seasons played (13, along with Vladimir Cvetković), 4th in games played (349) and 5th in points scored (4,612). From 1967 till 1975, Vučinić played 200 consecutive games, and he remains as one of two players in Yugoslav Basketball League history who played more than 200 consecutive games.

National team career 
Vučinić was a member of the Yugoslavia national team that won a silver medal at the 1971 European Championship in West Germany. Also, he won two silver medals for Yugoslavia Under-18 national team at European Championship for Juniors (1966 in Italy and 1968 in Spain).

Post-playing career

Coaching career  
In his final season as a player, 1978–79, Vučinić took role of an assistant coach for Crvena zvezda under head coach Bratislav Đorđević. Briefly, he was briefly the head coach, leading the team in 7 games, as a player-coach.

Basketball executive career  
Vučinić was the president of the Crvena zvezda from 1991 to 1994, when he collaborated with his former teammate Dragan Kapičić who was a director. Also, he has held the offices of President of Basketball Federation of Serbia.

Career achievements 
As player
 FIBA European Cup Winners' Cup winner: 1 (with Crvena zvezda: 1973–74)
 Yugoslav League champion: 2 (with Crvena zvezda: 1968–69, 1971–72)
 Yugoslav Cup winner: 3 (with Crvena zvezda: 1970–71, 1972–73, 1974–75)

See also 
 List of Red Star Belgrade basketball coaches
 List of KK Crvena zvezda players with 100 games played
 KK Crvena zvezda accomplishments and records

References

External links 
 Sportski spomenar #385

1948 births
Living people
Basketball players from Mostar
Bosnia and Herzegovina expatriate basketball people in Serbia
Centers (basketball)
KK Crvena zvezda head coaches
KK Crvena Zvezda executives
KK Crvena zvezda players
KK Lokomotiva Mostar players
Members of the Assembly of KK Crvena zvezda
Player-coaches
Serbian men's basketball players
Serbian men's basketball coaches
Serbs of Bosnia and Herzegovina
Yugoslav men's basketball players
Yugoslav basketball coaches